Franz Engstler (born 25 July 1961) is a German auto racing driver.

Racing career

Born in Kempten im Allgäu, Engstler started racing in the European Hillclimbing Championship and the German Long Distance Cup, which he won. From 1988 he competed in German Formula Three, winning the class B title in 1989. In 1993 he switched to Touring car racing, where he was German Touring Car Championship Class 2 champion in an Alfa Romeo 155. Between 1994 and 1999, he raced in the German Super Touring Championship for various teams. He finished first in the 2000 German Touring Car Challenge, with two wins. Two more seasons were spent racing in this series in 2002 and 2003.
After a season in the 2004 German Production Car Championship, he moved to the Asian Touring Car Championship. He dominated the championship, which bought him back to back titles in 2005 and 2006. Another title came in 2007, winning the German ADAC Procar Series for the second year.

2008 first saw him enter the WTCC. A solid first season saw him finish second in the independents Trophy. The highlight of the year was sixth place overall finish in the final race in Macau.

Before the end of the 2008 season, he won the BMW Sports Trophy for independent drivers, ahead of one hundred and forty other BMW drivers around the world.

Engstler was involved in a bizarre incident at the 2009 WTCC meeting at Pau. Having finished sixth in race one, he started race two from second position. He took the lead from Alain Menu at the start and led the first lap. The safety car was deployed following three separate incidents on the first lap. The safety car jinked left right into the middle of the circuit, and with the nature of the circuit, Engstler was unsighted as he slammed into the safety car causing substantial damage to both cars, ending his race.

Racing record

Complete Deutsche Tourenwagen Meisterschaft results
(key) (Races in bold indicate pole position) (Races in italics indicate fastest lap)

Complete Super Tourenwagen Cup results
(key) (Races in bold indicate pole position) (Races in italics indicate fastest lap)

Complete European Super Production Championship results
(key) (Races in bold indicate pole position) (Races in italics indicate fastest lap)

Complete European Touring Car Championship results
(key) (Races in bold indicate pole position) (Races in italics indicate fastest lap)

Complete World Touring Car Championship results
(key) (Races in bold indicate pole position) (Races in italics indicate fastest lap)

† Driver did not finish the race, but was classified as he completed over 90% of the race distance.

Complete TCR International Series results
(key) (Races in bold indicate pole position) (Races in italics indicate fastest lap)

References

External links

 
 
Safety Car Hunter by Engstler

1961 births
Living people
People from Kempten im Allgäu
Sportspeople from Swabia (Bavaria)
Racing drivers from Bavaria
German racing drivers
German Formula Three Championship drivers
24 Hours of Daytona drivers
Rolex Sports Car Series drivers
European Touring Car Championship drivers
European Touring Car Cup drivers
World Touring Car Championship drivers
TCR International Series drivers
Sports car racing team owners
Asian Touring Car Championship drivers
BMW M drivers
Josef Kaufmann Racing drivers
Nürburgring 24 Hours drivers
Engstler Motorsport drivers
Ferrari Challenge drivers